Korki or Kurki or Kuraki may refer to:
 Korki, North Khorasan
 Korki, Sistan and Baluchestan